Cape Enrage is the name given to the southern tip of Barn Marsh Island, an island located in Albert County, New Brunswick, Canada, roughly half way along the coastline between the villages of Riverside-Albert and Alma at the eastern entrance to Fundy National Park.

Accessible from Route 915, the island itself is surrounded by jagged sea cliffs that are often more than 50 metres (145 ft) high, and is separated from the mainland by a narrow tidal creek.

Cape Enrage derives its name from the large reef that extends south into Chignecto Bay, which causes the water off the point to become extremely violent, particularly at half tide when the reef is partially exposed and the water is moving quickly.

Cape Enrage Lighthouse

References

External links 

aerial view
Official website
Article on 'The Best View in Canada"

Headlands of New Brunswick
Landforms of Albert County, New Brunswick
Tourist attractions in Albert County, New Brunswick